Rose-Noëlle was a trimaran that capsized at 6 AM on June 4, 1989, in the southern Pacific Ocean off the coast of New Zealand. Four men (John Glennie, James Nalepka, Rick Hellriegel and Phil Hoffman) survived adrift on the wreckage of the ship for 119 days.

Capsize and survival 

After being hit by a rogue wave during a storm, the trimaran capsized, trapping the crew inside. After cutting an escape hatch, they set the Emergency position-indicating radiobeacon (EPIRB), convinced that they would be rescued a few days later. The water tanks, which contained 140 liters of fresh water, slowly emptied themselves unbeknown to the crew. The EPIRB, which had a radius of one hundred nautical miles, stopped working on June 13 after 8 days. They made a rain water collecting device by splitting lengths of plastic pipe. After about 2–3 months, barnacles and mollusks began to grow on the hulls, making fishing easier.

In popular culture
Their story is told in the 2015 New Zealand television film Abandoned, starring Dominic Purcell and Peter Feeney, along with Owen Black and Greg Johnson. It was directed by John Laing.

Actors
 Dominic Purcell as James Nalepka
 Peter Feeney as John Glennie, owner of Rose-Noëlle
 Owen Black as Rick Hellriegel
 Greg Johnson as Phil Hoffman
 Siobhan Marshall as Martha
 Daniel Cleary as Laing
 Serena Cotton as Heather
 Rachel Nash as Karen Hoffman

See also
List of people who disappeared mysteriously at sea

References

Further reading

External links
 
 

1980s missing person cases
Castaways
Formerly missing people
Individual sailing vessels
Maritime incidents in 1989
Sailing books
Shipwrecks in the Pacific Ocean
Survival skills
Trimarans